Shaki may refer to: 

Shaki, Armenia, a village in Armenia
Shaki, Azerbaijan, a city in Azerbaijan
Shaki District, a district in Azerbaijan
Shaki Khanate (1743–1819), a khanate in the territory of modern Azerbaijan
Shaki, Oyo State, a city in Nigeria
Shaki, another name for tripe, especially in West Africa

See also 
Saki (disambiguation)
 Shak (disambiguation)
Shakira (born 1977), Colombian pop singer-songwriter